Events from the year 1978 in Kuwait.

Incumbents
Emir: Jaber Al-Ahmad Al-Jaber Al-Sabah
Prime Minister: Jaber Al-Ahmad Al-Sabah (until 8 February), Saad Al-Salim Al-Sabah (starting 8 February)

Events

Births

2 August - Abdallah al-Ajmi.

See also
Years in Jordan
Years in Syria

References

 
Kuwait
Kuwait
Years of the 20th century in Kuwait
1970s in Kuwait